The Mark 21 nuclear bomb was a United States thermonuclear gravity bomb first produced in 1955. It was based on the TX 21 "Shrimp" prototype that had been detonated during the Castle Bravo test in March 1954. While most of the Operation Castle tests were intended to evaluate weapons intended for immediate stockpile, or which were already available for use as part of the Emergency Capability Program, Castle Bravo was intended to test a design which would drastically reduce the size and costs of the first generation of air-droppable atomic weapons (the Mk 14, Mk 17 & Mk 24).

Design

The Mk 21 Y1 had a yield of 18 to 19 megatons. The "clean" Mk 21 Y2 (later designated Mk 26) was tested at 4.5 megatons. All 275 Mk 21 weapons stockpiled were the Y1 version.

Quantity production of the Mk 21 started in December 1955 and ran until July 1956. Starting in June 1957 all Mk 21 bombs were converted to the more advanced Mk 36, which was removed from service in 1962.

Delivery system
The Mark 21 could only be delivered by bomber; it was carried by the B-36 and B-47. Weapon was carried in a sling apparatus. The bomb was equipped with a two-stage deployment system, including a  main ribbon canopy which provided up to 108 seconds of retardation.

To carry the Mk 21, the B-47 required the installation of special fin recesses in the bomb bay doors.

Tests
The Mk 21 (Mk 21 Y1, the version in the stockpile) was never tested. The Mk 21C (Mk 21 Y2) was proof tested as the Operation Redwing Navajo shot, with a yield of 4.5 megatons.

Specifications 
 Length: 
 Diameter: 
 Weight: 
 Fuzing: airburst—Contact burst was also available.
 Yield: 18 to 19 megatons
 Thermonuclear weapon

Users 
United States Air Force

See also
 List of nuclear weapons

References

Hansen, Chuck. ''U.S. Nuclear Weapons," Arlington, Texas, Areofax, Inc., 1988. .
O'Keefe, Bernard J. "Nuclear Hostages," Boston, Houghton Mifflin Company, 1983, .
Goetz, Peter. "A Technical History of America's Nuclear Arms Volume 1," 2020, 

Cold War aerial bombs of the United States
Nuclear bombs of the United States
Military equipment introduced in the 1950s